University of Toronto Schools (UTS) is an independent secondary day school affiliated with the University of Toronto in Toronto, Ontario, Canada. The school follows a specialized academic curriculum, and admission is determined by competitive examination. UTS is associated with two Nobel Prize laureates.

History

University of Toronto Schools was founded in 1910 as a "practice school", also known as a laboratory school, for the University of Toronto's Faculty of Education. As originally conceived and reflected in its present name, UTS was intended to be a collection of at least two schools, one of which would enroll female students. The original plan was to recruit 200 teachers and 1200 students, but financial constraints limited the number of students to 375 boys.

The school operated a junior ice hockey team during the 1910s and 1920s in the Ontario Hockey Association. The school won the J. Ross Robertson Cup as the playoffs champions in 1919, and were finalists in 1914 and 1923. The Memorial Cup was established as the junior hockey championship of Canada in 1919. The school defeated Montreal Melville by an 8–2 score in a single game playoff to qualify as the Eastern Canada representative at the 1919 Memorial Cup. They defeated the Regina Patricias in two games, by scores of 14-3 and 15–5. Memorial Cup alumnus Dunc Munro later played as a defenceman in the National Hockey League.

UTS's first headmaster was H. J. "Bull" Crawford, who also taught Classics at the school. Crawford was responsible for most administrative tasks, which, until a secretary was hired in 1921, included signing admit slips. In 1925, Mike Rodden coached the UTS Rugby team to an undefeated season, culminating in the Canadian Interscholastic Championship.

In 1934, A.C. Lewis succeeded John Althouse to become the third headmaster. In 1944, W. B. "Brock" MacMurray, a 1924 graduate of the school, became the fourth headmaster; his 28-year term at UTS remains the longest in school history. In 1957, the House System was established, with three of four houses named after the school's first three headmasters - Crawford, Althouse, and Lewis. The fourth house, Cody, was named after a former president of the University of Toronto.

The 1960s were a "turbulent" decade in the history of UTS. Prior to the 1960s, the Ontario Ministry of Education required seniors to complete a number of matriculation exams in order to graduate. The student who scored highest in his or her exams province-wide would be awarded the Prince of Wales Scholarship; during the matriculation era, UTS students won thirteen Prince of Wales Scholarships.

Although matriculation exams would eventually be abolished in the 1960s, UTS students had been calling for change since the late 1930s in the form of valedictory addresses and protests. Addresses in 1963 and 1966  targeted the tendency for matriculations to reduce "a tangible desire for knowledge", producing instead "a mind that cannot think for itself". In 1967 the valedictory address lambasted a number of teachers and administrators who had been responsible for rigidly holding UTS to its past. The speech was not published in The Twig the following year, but was still circulated among students. Discontent with the school's inability to reform climaxed in the "Protest for Nothing" in May 1969, which was led by Brian Blugerman, Michael Eccles, Paul Eprile and David Glennie. Unlike most protests, the placards that the protesters held were blank; when headmaster MacMurray asked for their demands, a student famously showed him a blank sheet of paper and stated, "This is a list of our demands." The protest was front-page news in Toronto newspapers and was widely reported in the U.S. media, including the New York Times.

At the turn of the decade, UTS developed a "New Program", which focused on completing subjects ("units") for graduation instead of matriculations. The administration also agreed to allow students to complete their secondary school requirements in 4 years instead of 5, an advantage that was enjoyed until the 2003 double cohort. The Executive Council was formed in 1968 to provide a liaison between students and staff. Some of the Executive Council's first recommendations were implemented in 1969, including making Latin optional after grade 11 and introducing non-numerical grades for Arts and Music courses. In addition to academics, certain aspects of the school's extracurricular traditions were gradually being phased out. In 1966, participation in the Cadet Corps, which had been a bastion of UTS tradition, became optional; in 1972, the "new administration" announced that the cadet corps would be discontinued.  Instead, it became an "open" corps, severing its affiliation with the school, and continues to this day. Change was also evident in the school's teaching staff: in the 1960s alone, 35 new teachers were hired, compared to only 15 hirings during the 1950s.

Donald Gutteridge had originally arrived in 1962 at MacMurray's request, and had taught Grade 13 English. In 1972, Gutteridge succeeded MacMurray. Although he was the school's fifth headmaster, he was the first to call himself a "principal". During his tenure as the Premier of Ontario, Bill Davis came under fire for publicly funding UTS, which Liberal education critic Tom Reed called an "elitist" institution. Under pressure from the provincial government and the University of Toronto, a decision was made to admit girls into the school. Two proposals were tabled: the first involved expanding the school by maintaining the same number of incoming boys, and the second involved maintaining the class size by reducing the number of incoming boys. On January 18, 1973, the University of Toronto approved the second proposal, paving the way for a co-educational UTS the following academic year.The first two co-educational cohorts totalled 70 students; each cohort was divided into two classes of 35 students. In spite of initial concerns about the watered-down quality of UTS boys athletics, the junior girls basketball team won a city title in 1978. In order to assist families in financial need, the UTS Endowment Fund was set up in 1980; in 1989, approximately $50,000 was distributed to students in need.

In April 1993, the New Democratic government of Ontario announced the withdrawal of public funding from the school, leading to a dramatic rise in tuition costs, and prompting the mobilization of all its constituencies to make up the loss.

In 2004, UTS became an ancillary unit of the University of Toronto separate from the Ontario Institute for Studies in Education. The school formed its own board of directors representing alumni, parents and the university administration. Throughout the 2009–2010 school year, the school celebrated its centennial year with the Kickoff celebration at Varsity Stadium and the Homecoming weekend to be held in the school itself. The centennial year also saw the introduction of its new school song, written by Nathalie Siah '10, the House Centennial spirit pennant, as well as the House Cup, awarding the House who collected the most points (athletic, literary, and spirit) over the school year.

In 2015, Anand Mahadevan, a teacher at University of Toronto Schools, was the recipient of the Prime Minister's Awards for Teaching Excellence.

Relocation and redevelopment
The University of Toronto informed UTS in 2011 that it was rejecting its proposal for a $48 million refurbishment of its facilities and that the university intends to reclaim the property at 371 Bloor Street West for its own use. UTS had been given until 2021 to find and move to new space. However, in 2014, it was announced by the chair of the UTS board of directors that the University of Toronto and UTS were negotiating to maintain an affiliation between the two institutions and keep the school at its present location but redevelop the site so that it could meet the needs of both the university and the school.

In October 2015, the University of Toronto and UTS announced a 50-year agreement that would renew the school's official affiliation with the university, allow UTS to remain on its Bloor Street campus, redevelop 70,000 square feet of its space as well as build a 70,000 square feet addition. The redevelopment proposal would include the construction of a 700-seat auditorium that would also function as a university classroom, a double gym, an atrium and a black box theatre. The university would retain ownership of the building and land but UTS would pay for construction and operating costs. The agreement is subject to approval by the university's governing council.

In 2018, UTS began fundraising for a redevelopment of the Bloor Street campus, under a campaign title of "Building the Future". The fundraising goal is $60 million. The redevelopment will include the creation of four new science labs, a blackbox theatre, an atrium, a media lab and visual arts rooms. In preparation of the redevelopment, UTS was relocated to its Ossington campus, 30 Humbert St. The school remained at the Humbert Street location until the week of April 4, 2022, when it returned to its original Bloor Street campus location.

Admissions
Most students enter in Grade 7 through a two-stage competitive process. Prior to the admission of the class of 2014, the first stage consisted of a multiple-choice exam; those who passed this test in the top percentiles (usually 200 students) were invited back for a second written exam and an interview. However, starting with the class of 2014, the admission process consists of the Secondary School Admission Test (SSAT), and for the top 170 - 190 applicants, a second exam (focused on Math and English) and an interview with multiple staff members and UTS alumni (using an MMI format). Ultimately, 96 candidates (48 boys and 48 girls) are chosen from around 350 applicants in the first-stage process each year; the typical cutoff for SSAT scores for Grade 7 entrance is in the mid to high 1900s for boys, and low 1900s for girls, depending on the applicant pool for that year. For upper-year entrance the process is slightly different. UTS will admit approximately 24 students, the average size of a class, for grade 9, and a handful at grade 10 and 11. Aside from a few cases, UTS rarely admits new students for grade 8. Usually, there is an equal number of boys and girls who are accepted into the school. On average, for the first year (F1/grade 7) there are four classes each of which consists of 26-27 students. Candidates must be Canadian citizens or landed immigrants and may apply to enter either Grade 7 or the upper school (Grade 9 and above).

Academics
UTS is attended by students from grades 7 through 12, with 78 students per grade in classes graduating before 2001, 104 students per grade in classes graduating before 2009, and 110 in classes graduating thereafter.

UTS has enriched courses and a specialized curriculum, which are designed to challenge and educate at a higher level than at most public and many independent schools. Because potential UTS candidates are required to pass a rigorous entrance examination to attend the school, its curriculum is accelerated on the assumption that its students assimilate information faster. For this reason several higher-grade subjects are taught at lower grade levels. For example, Grade 10 students can take an enriched version of Ontario's Grade 11 courses in introductory physics, biology, and/or chemistry and Grade 7 students take both the Ontario grade 7 curriculum and grade 8 curriculum. As well, effort is made to enrich classes with extra material and more in-depth discussions.

UTS offers Advanced Placement courses, but does not have an International Baccalaureate program. In addition to the Ontario Secondary School Diploma, graduates earn a UTS Diploma, which signifies the completion of certain specialized courses and attesting to an attainment level beyond the provincial standards.

UTS's rate of student achievement is commensurate with its selective admissions policy, both in academics and in extracurricular activities. Virtually all UTS students go on to university following graduation. The school's alumni include 22 Rhodes Scholars  and two Nobel Prize winners: chemist John Polanyi and economist Michael Spence.

UTS's grade level nomenclature differs from that used commonly in Ontario high schools. This nomenclature has varied somewhat over the many years, and is due in part to a curriculum whose courses do not fit neatly into the provincial grading system, and in part to what had until the elimination of Grade 13 in Ontario constituted a six-year course to seven grade levels. The grade level nomenclature, with rough equivalents, consists of:
Foundation Zero (F0): Grade 6 students who have been accepted to and will begin attending UTS the following school year. 
Foundation One (F1): Grade 7. Formerly known as Foundation Year (F)
Foundation Two (F2): Grade 8. Formerly known as Form II
Middle Three (M3): Grade 9. Formerly known as Form III
Middle Four (M4): Grade 10. Formerly known as Form IV
Senior Five (S5): Grade 11. Formerly known as Form V
Senior Six (S6): Grade 12. Formerly known as Form VI

Prior to the double cohort in 2003, F1 and F2 formed both halves of the Ontario Grade 7-9 curriculum; M3 was equivalent to Grade 10, and so forth.

Notable alumni
Brig-Gen. Donald Agnew, CBE, CD, Commandant of the Royal Military College of Canada
Chris Alexander, former Minister of Citizenship and Immigration and former Ambassador to Afghanistan
Jay Bahadur, journalist and author
Charles Baillie, OC, chancellor of Queen's University, former CEO of TD Bank
Henry J. M. Barnett, CC, neurologist 
Rod Beattie, actor
John Brewin, Member of Parliament
Ian Brodie, Chief of staff for prime minister Stephen Harper
Timothy Brook, historian
Catherine Bush, novelist
J. M. S. Careless, OC, OOnt, FRSC, historian and biographer, two-time winner of the Governor General's Award
Michael Cassidy (Canadian politician), leader of the New Democratic Party of Ontario
Jim Chamberlin, Chief designer of the Avro Arrow
Sujit Choudhry, law professor and former dean of the UC Berkeley School of Law
Paul Davis, sailor and bronze medallist (racing for Norway) at 2000 Summer Olympic Games 
Donald Redelmeier, internist, Professor of Medicine at University of Toronto, noted expert in medical decision making
John Duffy, political strategist
John Evans, CC, Rhodes Scholar, medical leader and former University of Toronto president
Robert Elgie, CM, MPP and Ontario cabinet minister
Mark Evans, rower and gold medallist in pairs sculling at 1984 Los Angeles Olympics
James Fleck, CC, businessman and philanthropist
David Frum, journalist and author
David Galloway, CEO of Torstar and chairman of the Bank of Montreal
George R. Gardiner, OC, businessman and co-founder of the Gardiner Museum
Thomas Gayford, equestrian and Olympic gold medallist
Peter George, CM, former president of McMaster University
Chris Giannou, CM, war surgeon, former Chief Surgeon of the International Committee of the Red Cross, and author
Donald B. Gillies, computer scientist
Peter Godsoe, OC, former Chairman of The Bank of Nova Scotia
Ian Goldberg, computer scientist and cryptographer
Laurie Graham, Olympic downhill skier, Alpine Champion
Joe Greene, DFC, PC, QC, Minister of Agriculture and Minister of Energy, Mines and Resources
Doug Hamilton, rower and bronze medallist at 1984 Los Angeles Olympics
John Ellis Hare, author and scholar of French-Canadian literature and history
Lawrence Hill, author and essayist
Greg Hollingshead, CM, novelist and winner of the Governor General's Award for Fiction
Thomas Hurka, philosopher
Hal Jackman, OC, OOnt, businessman and former Lieutenant Governor of Ontario
Dennis Lee, OC, poet
Pericles Lewis, literature professor and former president of Yale-NUS College 
Simu Liu, actor
John Macfarlane, magazine editor 
Thomas MacMillan, chairman of Gluskin Sheff and President and CEO of CIBC Mellon
C. B. Macpherson, OC, political theorist
Jack McClelland, CC, publisher
Claire Messud, novelist
Lydia Millet, author
Mavor Moore, CC, OBC, writer, producer, and public servant
Dunc Munro, hockey player, Stanley Cup winner, and Olympic gold medallist
Fraser Mustard, CC, OOnt, FRSC, medical pioneer and founder of the Canadian Institute for Advanced Research
William Thornton Mustard, OC, MBE, cardiac surgeon
Kevin Pho, internist and founder of KevinMD.com
John C. Polanyi, PC, CC, Nobel Prize winner for Chemistry, 1986
Dana Porter, Attorney General of Ontario and Chief Justice of the Court of Appeal for Ontario
Julian Porter, lawyer and chairman of the Toronto Transit Commission
John Riddell, Marxist writer and former leader of the League for Socialist Action
John Josiah Robinette, CC, OOnt, litigator and constitutional lawyer, Chancellor of Trent University
Edward S. Rogers Sr., inventor and radio pioneer
Robert Gordon Rogers, OC, OBC, 24th Lieutenant Governor of British Columbia and Chancellor of the University of Victoria
Peter H. Russell, OC, political scientist
Arthur Scace, CM, QC, lawyer and jurist
Donald Schmitt, architect
J. Blair Seaborn, CM, diplomat
Robert Seaborn, MC, Anglican Bishop of Newfoundland and Metropolitan of Canada
Jeffrey Simpson, OC, journalist
Charles Snelling, national figure skating champion and surgeon
James Sommerville, horn player and conductor
Raymond Souster, OC, poet and winner of the Governor General's Award
A. Michael Spence, Nobel Prize winner for Economics, 2001
Wishart Spence, CC, OBE, puisne justice of the Supreme Court of Canada
C. P. Stacey, OC, OBE, FRSC, historian
Harry Stinson, real estate developer
William W. Stinson, chairman of Canadian Pacific Railway and Sun Life Financial
Joseph Albert Sullivan, Olympic gold medallist, physician, and Senator
Wayne Sumner, philosophy professor and member of the Royal Society of Canada
Thomas Symons, CC, OOnt, FRSC, founding president of Trent University
John Tory, OOnt, former leader of the Progressive Conservative Party of Ontario and 65th Mayor of Toronto
John A. Tory, former financial advisor to Ken Thomson
Paul Tough, editor at the New York Times Magazine
Garth Turner, Conservative, then independent, then Liberal MP
Jessica Ware, entomologist
Brig. William Denis Whitaker, CM, DSO and Bar, ED, CD, athlete, soldier, businessman, and author
Graham Yost, screenwriter of Speed, Broken Arrow, Hard Rain, and two-time Emmy winner

References

Further reading
Batten, Jack.  University of Toronto Schools 1910-2010.
Chapnick, Adam, ed. Through Our Eyes: An Alumni History of UTS, 1960-2000. Toronto: University of Toronto Schools Alumni Association, 2005 (pdf).
Lane, Byron. University of Toronto Schools: An Academic History of the Era of Province-Wide Standardized Matriculation Testing in Ontario. Toronto: Byron Lane, 2005.

External links

University of Toronto Schools

High schools in Toronto
Toronto
Private schools in Toronto
University of Toronto
Educational institutions established in 1910
1910 establishments in Ontario